The 2022–23 Liverpool F.C. Women season is the club's 34th season of competitive football and first season back in the Women's Super League, the highest level of the football pyramid, since their relegation at the end of the 2019–20 season. Along with competing in the WSL, the club will also contest two domestic cup competitions: the FA Cup and the League Cup.

Squad

Preseason

Women's Super League

Results summary

Results by matchday

Results

League table

Women's FA Cup 

As a member of the first tier, Liverpool entered the FA Cup in the fourth round proper.

FA Women's League Cup

Group stage 

Group B

Ranking of second-placed teams

Knockout stage

Squad statistics

Appearances 

Starting appearances are listed first, followed by substitute appearances after the + symbol where applicable.

|-
|colspan="14"|Players who appeared for the club but left during the season:

|}

Transfers

Transfers in

Loans in

Transfers out

Loans out

References 

Liverpool
Liverpool L.F.C. seasons